Pedro Lucas Tápias Obermüller (born 26 July 2002), commonly known as Pedro Lucas, is a Brazilian professional footballer who plays as an attacking midfielder and right-winger for Campeonato Brasileiro Série B club Ceará, on loan from Grêmio.

Club career

Grêmio
Born in Baixo Guandu, Brazil, Pedro Lucas joined the Grêmio's Academy at the age of 12 in 2014.

Career statistics

Club

International

Honours
Brazil U17
FIFA U-17 World Cup: 2019

Grêmio
Campeonato Gaúcho: 2021, 2022
Recopa Gaúcha: 2021

References

External links

Profile at the Grêmio F.B.P.A. website

2002 births
Living people
Brazilian footballers
Brazil youth international footballers
Association football midfielders
Grêmio Foot-Ball Porto Alegrense players
Sportspeople from Espírito Santo